PEG or peg may refer to:

Devices 
 Clothes peg, a fastener used to hang up clothes for drying
 Tent peg, a spike driven into the ground for holding a tent to the ground
 Tuning peg, used to hold a string in the pegbox of a stringed instrument
 Piton, a metal spike that is driven into rock to aid climbing
 PEG tube, a medical device, that is, a percutaneous endoscopic gastrostomy tube 
 Foot peg, a place to put one's foot on a vehicle such as a motorcycle

Science and computing 
 Peg (unit), a measure used in preparing alcohol, from 1 to 2 fluid ounces
 Pegasus (constellation), a constellation named after Pegasus
 Percutaneous endoscopic gastrostomy, a medical procedure
 Polyethylene glycol, a chemical polymer
 Macrogol, the name for polyethylene glycol in pharmaceutical contexts
 Parsing expression grammar, a type of formal grammar used in mathematics and computer science
 PCI Express Graphics adapter, an abbreviation commonly used in BIOS settings

Recreation 
 Peg, a rule in the game of backyard cricket
 Peg, a position or post in a driven hunt where a gun will stand
 Peg (fishing), an area set aside for an angler
 Peg solitaire, a board game for one player
 Pegs, pieces from the board game The Game of Life representing people
 Pinnacle Entertainment Group, a game company

People 
 Peg, an abbreviation of Peggy (given name)

Transportation 
 Pegswood railway station, United Kingdom (by National Rail code)
 Perugia San Francesco d'Assisi – Umbria International Airport, Italy (by IATA airport code)

Other uses 
 PEG or PEGA channels, public, educational, and government access cable TV channels in the United States
 Peg, or fixed exchange-rate system, a system to value currencies
 PEG ratio, price/earnings to growth ratio, a stock price analysis tool
 Poetae epici Graeci, a collection of Greek epic and Orphic fragments, edited by Alberto Bernabé
 "Peg" (song), a song by Steely Dan
 Mnemonic peg system, a memory aid
 Producer Entertainment Group, a talent agency
 Program for the Exceptionally Gifted, a program at Mary Baldwin College
 Winnipeg, Manitoba, Canada, nicknamed "The Peg"

See also 
 Pegging (disambiguation) 
 Pegged
 Peggy (disambiguation)
 Pin